Trimble, also known as Trimble Town or Burch, is an unincorporated community in Cullman County, Alabama, United States.

History
Trimble is named after its first postmaster, William Trimble. A post office operated under the name Trimble from 1886 to 1905.

References

Unincorporated communities in Cullman County, Alabama
Unincorporated communities in Alabama